This article lists the winners and nominees for the Black Reel Award for Outstanding Actress in a Motion Picture. The award recognize an actress who has delivered an outstanding performance in a leading role within the given eligible period.

Nia Long received the very first award for The Best Man at the 1st Annual Black Reel Awards in 2000. Since its inception, the award has been given out to 21 actresses. With 6 nominations, Viola Davis hold the record for most nominations and tied with Sanaa Lathan for most wins with 2. Rosario Dawson is the most nominated actress in this category without a win. Gugu Mbatha-Raw is the only actress to earn multiple nominations in the same year for Belle & Beyond the Lights at the 14th Annual Black Reel Awards.

At age 9, Quvenzhane Wallis became the youngest actress to win this award for Beasts of the Southern Wild and at age 69, Irma P. Hall became the oldest winner in this category for The Ladykillers.

Winners and nominees
Winners are listed first and highlighted in bold.

2000s

2010s

2020s

Multiple nominations and wins

Multiple wins
 2 Wins
 Viola Davis
 Sanaa Lathan

Multiple nominations

 6 Nominations 
 Viola Davis

 5 Nominations
 Halle Berry
 Sanaa Lathan

 4 Nominations
 Rosario Dawson
 Queen Latifah

 3 Nominations
 Angela Bassett
 Kimberly Elise
 Taraji P. Henson
 Nia Long
 Gugu Mbatha-Raw
 Thandiwe Newton
 Zoe Saldana
 Tessa Thompson
 Alfre Woodard

 2 Nominations
 Nicole Beharie
 Beyoncé
 Regina Hall
 Jennifer Hudson
 Regina King
 Sophie Okonedo
 Keke Palmer
 Amandla Stenberg
 Gabrielle Union
 Quvenzhané Wallis
 Kerry Washington

Multiple nominations from the same film
 Kerry Washington and Regina King in Ray (2005)
 Queen Latifah (winner) and Jennifer Hudson in The Secret Life of Bees (2008)
 Sanaa Lathan and Alfre Woodard in The Family That Preys (2008)
 Kimberly Elise, Thandiwe Newton & Anika Noni Rose in For Colored Girls (2011)

Age superlatives

References

Black Reel Awards
Film awards for lead actress